MIL 55 is a class of fast inshore patrol craft operated by both naval forces of Iran.

Design
The boats are based on a model of Italian FB Design motorboats acquired by Iran in 2003. They are structurally monohull, and made of Kevlar.

References 

Fast patrol boat classes of the Navy of the Islamic Revolutionary Guard Corps
Ships built by Marine Industries Organization